The Red Hot Poker Tour hosts poker tournaments with no entry fees in Canadian bars and pubs.  Every night of the week, players can compete to accumulate points which they use to qualify for the end-of-season Tournament of Champions. Past champions have been rewarded with great prizes including trips to Las Vegas, buy-ins to the World Series of Poker, and seats at Daniel Negreanu's Protégé final table.

At the completion of its sixth season, the Tour expanded outside of Ontario for the first time, holding qualifying tournaments in British Columbia.  With the inclusion of online-based Red Club Room tournaments, players are now able to compete via the internet through events hosted on PartyPoker.  

The Season 7 Tournament of Champions winner was the first champion to be rewarded with a buy-in to a $10,000 tournament: a seat at the Main Event of the World Series of Poker.  The Season 8 prize was a buy-in to the $10,000 Main Event at the second annual World Poker Tour North American Poker Championship at Fallsview Casino.  For Season 10, the winner was given a choice of one of three World Poker Tour tournaments, and wound up playing at the LA Poker Classic.

To start Season 11, Red Hot announced they would be sponsored by the World Poker Tour, and all of its online games would be played at WorldPokerTour.com.

From Season 12 onwards, the Red Hot Poker Tour has featured its sponsor: PartyPoker.  With PartyPoker's support, Red Hot has helped send numerous players to the World Series of Poker.

Game play
Tournaments are played at 8-player tables.  Each player is given 8000 chips to start: 12 red chips (worth 25 each), 7 blues (worth 100 each), 6 greens (worth 500 each). and 4 black chips (worth 1000 each). Yellow chips (worth 5000), and purple/pink chips (worth 10,000) are used later in the tournament.

Blinds start at 25-50 and increase in value every 20 minutes.

Points
Players receive 25 points for each tournament that they participate in.  Additionally, all players who make the final table receive bonus points depending on their finish position:

1st place: 1000

2nd place: 700

3rd place: 500

4th place: 400

5th place: 300

6th place: 200

7th place: 125

8th place: 75

Tournament of Champions Winners

References

External links
Official site

Poker tournaments
Poker in North America